The Sa'ar 4 or Reshef-class missile boats were a series of missile boats built based on Israeli Navy designs grounded in accumulated experience derived in the operation of "Cherbourg" (Sa'ar 1, Sa'ar 2, and ) classes. Thirteen were built at the Israel Shipyards, ten for the Israeli Navy and three for the South African Navy.  Another six were built for the South African Navy in South Africa with Israeli assistance.

Sa'ar 4 boats' first battle engagements occurred in the October 1973 Yom Kippur War when two Sa'ar 4 boats, INS Reshef and INS Keshet,  engaged Egyptian and Syrian ships and coastal targets. Israel had sold most of its Sa'ar 4 boats to other navies, but INS Nitzachon and INS Atzmaut remained in active Israeli Navy service until 2014.

Variants

Israel
Ten Sa'ar 4-class boats were built for the Israeli Navy.  only two remain in service.  Three were disassembled, with systems taken for use in the construction of  vessels.  Three vessels and one hull stripped of systems were sold to Chile.  Two vessels were sold to Sri Lanka.

South Africa

The  (formerly designated Minister class) in service with the South African Navy are modified Sa'ar 4 (Reshef-class) fast attack craft.  In 1974, a contract was signed with Israeli Military Industries for the construction of three of the modified Reshef class vessels at the Haifa facility of Israeli Shipyards.  A further three were built immediately after at the Sandock Austral shipyard in Durban, South Africa, with three more being built at the same facility several years later. The imposition of the international embargo on the sale of arms to South Africa on 4 November 1977 forced the project to be carried out under a cloak of security.  The South African variants were fitted with Gabriel missiles, known in South Africa as 'Scorpion' missiles, and had two OTO Melara 76 mm guns instead of a single one with a Phalanx CIWS.

Chile 
In 1979, the Chilean Navy purchased its first Sa'ar 4, followed by a second in 1980 and a final two boats in 1997. Papudo (ex INS Tarshish) was purchased with several missing systems and due to budgetary constraints was retired in 1998, only a year after entering service. All Sa'ar 4s in service with the Chilean Navy are armed with two OTO Melara 76 mm guns, eight Gabriel missile launchers and two Oerlikon 20 mm cannon with the exception of Angamos which was modernized in 2013 replacing four of the Gabriel missile launchers with four Exocet MM40 launchers. Three Sa'ar 4s remain in service as of 2020.

Sri Lanka
It is not certain if these boats retain the Harpoon missile capability, however, these boats retained their Gabriel missile capability.

See also
 
 Israeli Sea Corps
 Tunis Raid

References

External links

 Israeli Weapons dealer
 Israeli Weapons
 Project Japonica: The secret building of South African Strike Craft in Israel, 1975-79

Missile boat classes
Missile boats of the Israeli Navy
Missile boats of the Chilean Navy
Missile boats of the South African Navy
Missile boats of the Sri Lanka Navy
 
Israel–South Africa relations